Clanis titan, the scarce velvet hawkmoth, is a species of moth of the family Sphingidae.

Distribution 
It is found from India and Nepal east and south through Myanmar and Yunnan in south-western China to Thailand, Vietnam and Peninsular Malaysia.

Description 
The wingspan is 128–148 mm.

Biology 
The larvae have been recorded feeding on Pterocarpus marsupium in India and Dalbergia olivieri in Laos and Thailand.

References

Clanis
Moths described in 1903